The Gymslips were an English all-female punk band from London, England, active in the early 1980s.

Career
The original band of Suzanne Scott (bassist / vocalist), Paula Richards (guitarist / vocalist) and Karen Yarnell (drummer) got together in 1980, but first played as The Gymslips in August 1981. The band supported the Dolly Mixture on a UK tour. They contributed the song "Midnight City" to all-female compilation LP, Making Waves.

A tour supporting the Androids of Mu and Rock Goddess followed. In the spring of 1982 they recorded their first of five sessions for John Peel after which they signed to Abstract Records. Their first single "48 Crash" (a cover of the Suzi Quatro hit) was released in November 1982, and the follow-up "Big Sister" was released at the beginning of 1983. April 1983 saw the release of their Rocking With the Renees LP, which also saw the band expand to a four piece with the addition of keyboardist Kathy Barnes.

With two further Peel sessions, good reviews for the "Robot Man" single and the release of the album in a different sleeve and with the title "Drink Problem" for the American market, The Gymslips' future looked bright. But twelve months of personnel and contractual problems, led to Richards having to recruit a new line-up and start all over again. With Karen Kay on bass, Sue Vickers on keyboards and Michelle Chowrimootoo on drums, The Gymslips recorded their final Peel session in the summer of 1984, before issuing their last single "Evil Eye" (produced by the Angelic Upstarts' Mond Cowie) in early 1985, and then calling it a day soon after its release.

Karen Yarnell went on to join Serious Drinking, and The Blubbery Hellbellies. Paula Richards joined The Deltones and then Potato 5, before again teaming up with Yarnell in band called The Renees, and issuing the LP, Have You Got It, as well as contributing the track, "He Called Me a Fat Pig and Walked Out On Me", to the female-only compilation, Postcard From Paradise.

Discography
Singles and EPs

Albums

References

All-female punk bands
English punk rock groups
English post-punk music groups
Street punk groups